No Such Thing may refer to:
"No Such Thing" (Chris Cornell song), a 2007 single
No Such Thing (film), a 2001 film by Hal Hartley
"No Such Thing" (John Mayer song), a 2001 single
"No Such Thing", a song by Dwight Yoakam from Population Me, 2003
"There's No Such Thing As A Jaggy Snake"
"No Such Thing as Vampires", the pilot episode of the TV series Moonlight
There's No Such Thing as Vampires, a 2020 horror film

See also
There's no such thing as a free lunch or TINSTAAFL